Kira Aundrea Lewis Jr. (born April 6, 2001) is an American professional basketball player for the New Orleans Pelicans of the National Basketball Association (NBA). He played college basketball for the Alabama Crimson Tide.

High school career
Lewis played basketball for Hazel Green High School in Hazel Green, Alabama for three years. As a junior, he averaged 28.5 points, 5.9 rebounds, 4.5 assists, and 3.9 steals per game and led his team to the Alabama Class 6A semifinals. Lewis earned first-team All-State honors for his second consecutive season, was a finalist for Alabama Mr. Basketball, and was named Huntsville Region Player of the Year and Alabama Class 6A Player of the Year. He was originally in the 2019 class but graduated early from high school and reclassified to 2018. On August 10, 2018, Lewis committed to Alabama over several major NCAA Division I offers, including from Indiana and Kansas. He was considered a four-star recruit by ESPN and 247Sports.

College career
In his freshman season with Alabama, Lewis, at age 17, was the second-youngest player in NCAA Division I basketball behind Everett Perrot of Pepperdine and was the youngest player to appear in a game. Lewis scored six points in his first career game versus Southern. The following game, he had 21 points against Appalachian State and followed that up with a season-high 24 points against Wichita State. He tied his season-high of 24 points against Georgia in February 2019. Lewis averaged 13.5 points, 2.9 assists, and 2.6 rebounds per game and was named to the SEC All-Freshman Team. However, Alabama struggled and finished 18–16, losing in the first round of the NIT. Lewis entered the transfer portal before new coach Nate Oats convinced him to return.

In his sophomore season opener, Lewis scored a then-career-high 30 points in an 81–80 loss to Penn. Lewis scored a career-high 37 points on February 8, 2020, in a 105–102 overtime win against Georgia. On February 12, he became the first Alabama player since 1996 to record a triple double, posting 10 points, 10 rebounds and 13 assists in a 95–91 overtime loss to Auburn. He became the 2nd player in school history to reach this accomplishment. On February 25, Lewis contributed 29 points, seven rebounds, and four assists in a 80–73 loss to Mississippi State. At the conclusion of the regular season, Lewis was named to the First Team All-SEC. As a sophomore, Lewis averaged 18.5 points, 4.8 rebounds, and 5.2 assists per game. After the season, Lewis declared for the 2020 NBA draft.

Professional career

New Orleans Pelicans (2020–present)
Lewis was selected with the 13th pick in the 2020 NBA draft by the New Orleans Pelicans. On November 30, 2020, he signed with the Pelicans.

Lewis was a rotational player to start the year. His first career game with double-digit scoring came January 13 against the Los Angeles Clippers. He had 10 points that game. He registered a career high 16 points and 6 assists on March 23 against the Los Angeles Lakers.

On December 8, 2021, Lewis tore his ACL and sprained his MCL during a 114–120 overtime loss to the Denver Nuggets, ending his season.

National team career
Lewis played for the United States at the 2019 FIBA Under-19 World Cup in Heraklion, Greece. He averaged four points and 1.6 assists per game and helped his team win a gold medal.

Career statistics

NBA

|-
| style="text-align:left;"| 
| style="text-align:left;"|New Orleans
| 54 || 0 || 16.7 || .386 || .333 || .843 || 1.3 || 2.3 || .7 || .2 || 6.4
|-
| style="text-align:left;"| 
| style="text-align:left;"|New Orleans
| 24 || 0 || 14.2 || .404 || .224 || .833 || 1.6|| 2.0 || .5 || .0 || 5.9
|- class="sortbottom"
| style="text-align:center;" colspan="2"|Career
| 78 || 0 || 16.0 || .391 || .298 || .841 || 1.4 || 2.2 || .6 || .1 || 6.2

College

|-
| style="text-align:left;"|2018–19
| style="text-align:left;"|Alabama
| 34 || 34 || 31.6 || .433 || .358 || .783 || 2.6 || 2.9 || .8 || .3 || 13.5
|-
| style="text-align:left;"|2019–20
| style="text-align:left;"|Alabama
| 31 || 31 || 37.6 || .459 || .366 || .802 || 4.8 || 5.2 || 1.8 || .6 || 18.5
|- class="sortbottom"
| style="text-align:center;" colspan="2"|Career
| 65 || 65 || 34.5 || .447 || .362 || .793 || 3.6 || 4.0 || 1.3 || .4 || 15.9

References

External links
 Alabama Crimson Tide bio
 USA Basketball bio

2001 births
Living people
African-American basketball players
Alabama Crimson Tide men's basketball players
American men's basketball players
Basketball players from Alabama
New Orleans Pelicans draft picks
New Orleans Pelicans players
People from Madison County, Alabama
Point guards
21st-century African-American sportspeople